Martin Klein (12 September 1884 – 11 February 1947) was an Estonian wrestler who competed for the Russian Empire at the 1912 Summer Olympics. He won the silver medal in the middleweight class, becoming the first Olympic medalist from Estonia. In the semifinal against the reigning world champion Alfred Asikainen, the two grappled for 11 hours and 40 minutes on a sunny day outdoors, until Klein managed to pin Asikainen. Klein was so exhausted from the bout – the longest wrestling match ever recorded – that he was unable to wrestle for the gold the next day, leaving Swedish wrestler Claes Johansson with the gold medal.

Biography
Klein was born to a farmer and started training in wrestling only in his twenties. He left home aged 17 to work as a sailor, but after two years, together with his brother, signed up to a factory in Saint Petersburg, which was then the capital of the Russian Empire. Seeking additional incomes, he became a night-shift guardian in a wrestling club and in this way was introduced to the sport.

In 1910 Klein won his first title, at St. Petersburg Championships in the unlimited class. Besides the 1912 Olympics, he also competed at the 1913 World Championships, but withdrew due to a hand injury. The same year he won the Russian heavyweight title. During World War I he served in the Russian army and later took part in the Estonian War of Independence. In 1919 he became a wrestling coach and prepared Estonian wrestlers for the 1920 Olympics. At those Games he was also offered a place as a competitor, but refused in favor of his younger teammates. Klein continued coaching and competing in wrestling in Estonia until 1937. He died as a consequence of a hernia, which he developed when moving logs and was buried in the Tarvastu cemetery. Since 1962 an international Martin Klein Memorial in Greco-Roman wrestling is held in Viljandi, Estonia.

References

1884 births
1947 deaths
People from Viljandi Parish
People from the Governorate of Livonia
Estonian male sport wrestlers
Wrestlers at the 1912 Summer Olympics
Male sport wrestlers from the Russian Empire
Olympic competitors for the Russian Empire
Olympic medalists in wrestling
Medalists at the 1912 Summer Olympics